Army Group G (Heeresgruppe G) fought on the Western Front of World War II and was a component of OB West.

History
When the Allied invasion of Southern France took place, Army Group G had eleven divisions with which to hold France south of the Loire. Between August 17 and 18, the German Armed Forces High Command ordered Army Group G (with the exception of the troops holding the fortress ports) to abandon southern France. The German LXIV Corps, which had been in charge of troops in the southwest since First Army had been withdrawn a few weeks earlier to hold the line on the River Seine southeast of Paris, formed three march groups and withdrew eastward toward Dijon. At the same time, the German Nineteenth Army, retreated northward through the Rhône valley toward the Plateau de Langres where it was joined by the German Fifth Panzer Army which was assigned to Army Group G so that a counter-attack could be delivered against the United States Third Army. The retreat did not go according to plan, as the Nineteenth Army retreated many personnel of Army Group G were taken prisoner by the Sixth United States Army Group. By the time the retreat was over General Johannes Blaskowitz had lost about half his force and was relieved on 21 September by General Hermann Balck. By mid September the Fifth were in position on the left wing of the German line north of the Swiss border. From there the Fifth Panzer with elements of the First attacked the United States Third Army, while the much reduced German 19th Army opposed the French First Army and the U.S. Seventh Army under General Alexander M. Patch.

Army Group G fought in the Vosges Mountains during November 1944 and retreated through Lorraine and north Alsace during December. In late November 1944, Army Group G temporarily lost responsibility for the German troops in the Colmar Pocket and on the Rhine River south of the Bienwald to the short-lived Army Group Oberrhein. In January 1945 the Army Group attacked in operation Nordwind, the last big German counter-attack on the Western Front. With the failure of Nordwind and the ejection of the Germans from the Colmar Pocket, Army Group Oberrhein was dissolved and Army Group G reassumed responsibility for the defense of southwestern Germany.

Unable to halt the offensive by Allied troops that cleared the Rhineland-Palatinate and subsequently assaulted over the Rhine River, Army Group G's troops nevertheless fought to defend the cities of Heilbronn, Crailsheim, Nuremberg and Munich during April 1945.

Army Group G surrendered to U.S. forces at Haar, in Bavaria, in Germany on May 5, 1945.

Commanders
The following persons served as commanders of the group.

Order of battle

Notes

References
Cole, Hugh M.  UNITED STATES ARMY IN WORLD WAR: The European Theater of Operations THE ARDENNES: BATTLE OF THE BULGE
Pogue, Forrest C. United States Army in World War II: European Theater of Operations: The Supreme Command

The German View website of the 100th (U.S.) Infantry Division Association

G
Military units and formations disestablished in 1945
Military units and formations established in 1944